Tadese Worku (born 20 January 2002) is an Ethiopian long-distance runner. He won the 3000 metres at the 2021 World Athletics U20 Championships.

References

External links
 

2003 births
Living people
Place of birth missing (living people)
Ethiopian male long-distance runners
World Athletics U20 Championships winners
21st-century Ethiopian people